The anime television series Fire Force is based on the manga series of the same name written and illustrated by Atsushi Ohkubo. The adaptation by studio David Production was announced on November 14, 2018. The series is directed by Yuki Yase, with Yamato Haijima handling the series' scripts, Hideyuki Morioka designing the characters and Kenichiro Suehiro composing the music. The first season aired from July 6 to December 28, 2019 on Japan News Network stations MBS and TBS as part of the Super Animeism block. It ran for 24 episodes. Funimation has licensed the series for streaming on FunimationNow. Due to the Kyoto Animation arson attack on July 19, 2019, Episode 3, which was originally scheduled to air on July 20, 2019, was postponed to July 27, 2019.

On July 19, 2019, it was announced that the series would premiere on Adult Swim's Toonami programming block on July 28, 2019.

A second season aired from July 4 to December 12, 2020. A third season was announced in May 2022.



Series overview

Episode list

Season 1 (2019)

Season 2 (2020)

Notes

References

 
Lists of anime episodes